Francisco Javier Asalgado was the second and fourth mayor of the commune of Pichilemu, an office which he held between May 1905 and September 1909, and between May and September 1912.

Biography

Political career
In 1900, Francisco Javier Asalgado was elected segundo alcalde of Pichilemu, as José María Caro Martínez began his third term as mayor (primer alcalde) of the commune. He was re-elected segundo alcalde of the commune in 1903. However, on 7 May 1905, just one year short of the end of his term, José María Caro Martínez resigned as mayor and decided to complete his term only as a regidor. In spite of this, the city council named Francisco Javier Asalgado as the acting primer alcalde. He served the remainder of Caro Martínez's term, which lasted until the next year. He was elected primer alcalde in the election of 1906.

He ran again for primer alcalde of Pichilemu in 1909. The results of the March 1909 municipal election were controversial, with Francisco Javier Asalgado and Carlos Salas Salas disputing the primer alcalde office. However, an appeals court ruled in favor of Salas in September that year. After Salas' term was completed, he once again ran for the office of primer alcalde, and was elected. He began his second term on 5 May 1912 but decided to retire the next month. His resignation became effective on 22 September 1912. José Santos Becerra, segundo alcalde was named as acting primer alcalde.

References

External links
 

Year of birth missing
Year of death missing
Mayors of Pichilemu